Diego José Benavente Bustamante (born 1790–21 June 1867) was a Chilean politician who served as President of the Senate of Chile.

External links
 BCN Profile

1817 births
1867 deaths
Chilean people
Chilean politicians
Conservative Party (Chile) politicians
Presidents of the Senate of Chile
People from Concepción, Chile